Knutsford Town Council is the town council for the Cheshire Market Town of Knutsford. It was established in 1974 as a successor council to the Knutsford Urban District Council. The Council last full elections were held in  May 2019 which, being uncontested, saw the Conservative Party claim 12 of the 15 seats; by-elections in May 2021 saw the Conservatives lose a seat to an Independent candidate. The Council is split into four wards, Nether (3), Norbury Booths (3), Over (6) and Bexton (3).

In 2021, Town Clerk to Knutsford Town Council, Adam Keppel-Green, was named Clerk of the Year in the NALC Star Council Awards.

Precursor
The Knutsford Urban District Council was an Urban District Council for the town of Knutsford, Cheshire from 1895 to 1974. It was established in 1895 following the establishment and dissolution of parish councils created under the Local Government Act 1894 for Nether Knutsford and Over Knutsford. The Urban District Council was dissolved in 1974 upon the creation of the Knutsford Town Council.

Powers and functions
The Town Council derives the bulk of its powers from the Local Government Act 1972 and subsequent legislation. The Council adopted the General Power of Competence in 2013 giving it a greater range of powers in line with the Localism Act 2011. The Town Council is a Market Authority, operating an Indoor Market Hall and licensing other markets within its boundary, including a monthly Makers' Market of artisan and local producers. The Town Council operates public toilets, a cemetery and chapel, and Allotments and is seeking to take ownership of the Council Offices and certain open spaces from Cheshire East Council. The Town Council delivers a programme of community events and undertakes a range of initiatives to support the town centre.

Town Mayor 
At its inception the newly formed Town Council resolved that the Chairman be styled Town Mayor. The Mayor is elected annually at the Annual Council Meeting in May. The incumbent is Cllr Mike Houghton who took office in May 2022. The Mayor acts a Leader/Chairman of the Town Council and also undertakes an important ambassadorial role, attending community events, opening shops and businesses and acting as a representative of the town in neighbouring areas. The Mayor also hosts a number of fundraising events throughout the year raising money for chosen charities.

Elections

2023 Election
Elections are due to be held on 4 May 2023 for the four wards of the Town Council on the same day as elections to Cheshire East Council.

By-Elections 2019-2023
Two by-elections were held in May 2021. A by-election for Nether Ward was triggered in April 2020 following the resignation of Katherine Fletcher who had been elected as an MP in December 2019 whilst a by-election for Bexton Ward was triggered following the death of Cllr Barbara Hamilton Coan in November 2020. Both elections had been on hold until May 2021 due to the moratorium on elections under the Coronavirus Act 2020. In February 2023, Cllr Jan Nicholson resigned as Deputy Town Mayor and councillor, the vacancy was left unfilled until the May 2023 elections.

2019 Election
Elections were held for all four wards in May 2019. All elections were uncontested and one vacancy was left on Over Ward which was filled by co-option with Conservative Elizabeth Beswick.

By-Elections 2015-2019
A by-election was held for Norbury Booths ward on 5 April 2018  following the resignation of incumbent Independent Councillor Charlotte Greenstein

 

 

A by-election was held for Over ward on 4 May 2017  following the resignation of incumbent Independent Councillor Yvonne Bancroft

2015 Election
Elections were held on 7 May 2015 for the four wards of the Town Council on the same day as elections to Cheshire East Council and Tatton (UK Parliament constituency) Parliamentary seat. Bexton Ward was not contested with the three candidates being elected unopposed. Nether Ward ended in a dead heat between two candidates, settled by the drawing of lots.

By-Elections 2011-2015
A by-election was held for Nether Ward on 13 November 2014 following the death of incumbent Conservative Councillor, Clive Nicholson.

 
 

 

A by-election was held for Over Ward on 7 February following the resignation of incumbent Conservative Councillor Bernadette Emmett.

2011 Election
Elections were held on 5 May 2011. Both Norbury Booths and Nether Wards were uncontested, returning three Conservative councillors each.

References

Knutsford
Town Councils in Cheshire
Local precepting authorities in England